The 1997 Cuba hotel bombings were a series of  terrorist bombing attacks on Cuban hotels organized by anti-Communist militants. The purpose of the bombing campaign was to destroy the recently resurgent Cuban tourism trade and in so doing, undermine the country's Communist government. The first and worst of the explosions took place at the Hotel Copacabana at about 11:30 AM (local time), and killed Fabio di Celmo, a 32-year-old Genoan, from Italy, and resident of Montreal, according to the Italian Foreign Ministry in Rome. Di Celmo was visiting Cuba with his father and staying in the hotel. 11 other tourists were also injured in the bombings. The hotels targeted included the Hotel Capri, Hotel Nacional de Cuba, and the Meliá Cohiba Hotel. Cuban-exile and former CIA asset, Luis Posada Carriles, admitted organizing the bombings. In a taped interview with The New York Times, Posada said: "It is sad that someone is dead, but we can't stop." Posada was reportedly disappointed with the reluctance of American news organisations to report the bombing attacks, saying "If there is no publicity, the job is useless".

In March 1999 Raúl Ernesto Cruz León, who Posada admitted was a mercenary under his employment, was sentenced to death by the Cuban authorities after admitting to the attacks, alongside fellow Salvadoran Otto René Rodríguez Llerena. The sentences were commuted in 2010 to 30 years in prison. In December 2010 another Salvadoran, Francisco Chávez Abarca, was sentenced to 30 years for his part in the bombings, having confessed on television to being hired by Posada Carriles.

In March 2005 Posada entered the US on a false passport and requested political asylum. Presidents Fidel Castro of Cuba and Hugo Chávez of Venezuela both demanded extradition. He lived in Miami until he was detained by homeland security following an interview he gave to the Miami Herald, in which he claimed to have entered the US without papers. He was then placed under house arrest. In September 2005 a US immigration judge ruled he could not be extradited to Venezuela or Cuba as he faced the threat of torture in these countries. In January 2009 Posada was indicted on charges of obstruction of justice, immigration fraud, and perjury by a federal grand jury. He was cleared on all counts in April 2011.

See also

 Cuban Five
 1996 shootdown of Brothers to the Rescue aircraft

In popular culture

Film

 Wasp Network, 2019.

Literature

 The Last Soldiers of the Cold War by Fernando Morais, 2011.

References

External links
 A Bombers Tale: Key Cuba Foe Claims Exiles' Backing by Ann Louise Bardach, The New York Times, July 12, 1998

Explosions in 1997
1997 crimes in Cuba
Terrorist incidents in North America in 1997
Terrorist incidents in Cuba
Attacks on hotels in North America
1990s murders in Cuba
1997 murders in North America
Hotel bombings